Dream House is a show on HGTV produced by High Noon Entertainment and Sage Productions in the United States. Each season follows one person, couple, or family as they complete a new build or renovate an existing home, to obtain their dream house. Past seasons have featured thirteen 30-minute episodes, but the most recent seasons have only eight 30-minute episodes.

The show is filmed in a semi-documentary style, with the camera crew acting only as an observer and unseen host Jose Marrero providing voice over comments.  Each season covers many aspects of building a house, including laying the foundation, weather delays, tackling restrictive terrain, dealing with permits, putting on the finishing touches, budgetary issues, and arguments between the homeowners and contractors.

Format 
Episodes in the first nine seasons of the show focused on the very basics of building, starting with financing in episode one, choosing a builder in episode 2, etc. In subsequent seasons, episodes focus more on the challenges of each project, highlighting arguments between the contractors and the home owner, and the strain that the construction causes to the family. The first episode of each season usually starts when the ground is broken or actual construction starts.

Season list

References

External links
 Official

Dream House San Diego

HGTV original programming